Zacatrophon beebei is a species of sea snail, a marine gastropod mollusk in the family Muricidae, the murex snails or rock snails.

Description
This attractive shell has an open channel along the suture of the whorl and is yellowish to pinkish brown in color, and bears a row of guttered spines on the shoulder of the whorl.  Length 52 mm, diameter 23 mm.

Distribution
This snail is found subtidally in deep water in the southern part of the Gulf of California, Mexico, at 90 to 110 m depth.

References

Ocenebrinae
Gastropods described in 1948